Love Starved Heart: Rare and Unreleased is a compilation album by Marvin Gaye. Released in 1994 on Motown Records, the collection features some rarities from the soul singer's catalog during his formative years in the label between his breakthrough year as an R&B star in 1963 to around the time of his late-1960s hits including "I Heard It through the Grapevine". Covering material he worked on with figures such as Holland-Dozier-Holland, Smokey Robinson and William "Mickey" Stevenson, the disc showcases Gaye's growth as a vocalist. In 1999, an expanded version was released under the title Lost and Found: Love Starved Heart, including bonus tracks and a rare interview.

Track listing 
"It's a Desperate Situation" (Ivy Jo Hunter, Pam Sawyer) (3:05)
"I Found Something" (Frank Wilson) (2:22)
"When I Feel the Need" (Nickolas Ashford, Valerie Simpson) (3:14)
"This Love Starved Heart of Mine (It's Killing Me)" (Kay Lewis, Helen Lewis) (2:40)
"You're a Son of a Gun" (Anna Gordy Gaye, George Gordy, Allen Story) (2:27)
"For Us Both I'll Be Concerned" (Anna Gordy Gaye, George Gordy, Allen Story) (2:37)
"Darling You're Wonderful" (David Hamilton, Clarence O. Paul) (2:10)
"Sad Souvenirs" (Hunter, William "Mickey" Stevenson) (2:39)
"I Can't Help It (I Love You)" (Hunter) (3:21)
"It's a Lonely World Without Your Love" (Hunter, Stevenson) (2:17)
"Say When" (Johnny Bristol) (2:36)
"Lucky, Lucky Me" (Henry Cosby, Hunter, Sylvia Moy, Verdi) (2:49)
"Get Away Heartbreak (Keep on Moving)" (Bullock, Bristol, Mannis) (3:23)
"Court of the Common Plea" (Gaye, Gaye, Stover) (2:56)
"You Make Me Do Things (I Don't Want to Do)" (Cosby, Guillemette, Hinton) (3:13)
"Hope I Don't Get My Heart Broke" (Cosby, Guillemette, Hinton) (3:34)

1999 expanded edition bonus tracks
"You're the One" (Gaye, Gaye, Stover) (3:17)
"Dark Side of the World" (Ashford, Simpson) (3:05)
"I'm in Love with You" (Broadnax, Paul) (2:57)
"Just a Little Love (Before My Life Is Gone)" (Hunter, Stevenson) (2:45)
"Baby I'm Glad That Things Work Out So Well" (Moore, Robinson, Tarplin) (3:01)
"Hanging On" (Hunter, Stevenson) (2:43)
"Gotta Say It, Gonna Tell It Like It Is" (Holland–Dozier–Holland) (2:20)
"Love's More Precious Than Gold" (Hamilton, Stevenson) (2:52)
"Loving and Affection" (Gaye, Grant, Paul) (2:28)
"Marvin Gaye Interview Excerpt" (1:00)

Credits
Lead vocals by Marvin Gaye
Background vocals by Marvin Gaye, The Andantes, The Originals, The Love Tones, The Supremes, Jimmy Beavers and Ashford & Simpson
Instrumentation by The Funk Brothers and the Detroit Symphony Orchestra

References 

1994 greatest hits albums
1999 greatest hits albums
Albums produced by Ivy Jo Hunter
Albums produced by Marvin Gaye
Albums produced by Ashford & Simpson
Albums produced by Berry Gordy
Marvin Gaye compilation albums
Motown compilation albums